Fabulous Sin City Roller Derby or Sin City Roller Derby (SCRD), is a women's flat track roller derby league based in Las Vegas, Nevada. Founded in 2004, Sin City is a founding member of the Women's Flat Track Derby Association (WFTDA).

History
Sin City began as the Las Vegas Neanderdolls in 2005, started by coaches Ivanna S. Pankin, owner of the online store Sin City Skates, and her partner Trish the Dish. Ivanna and Trish had played with the Arizona Roller Derby and finding no team in Las Vegas, created one. Shawna th'Dead was the first member of Neanderdolls. The Neanderdolls grew in membership and became a travel only team. Thereafter they changed to the SCRG.

As of April 2010, the SCRG consisted of four home teams and a travel team. The four Las Vegas-themed home teams are the Tommy Gun Terrors, The Notorious VIP, Hoover Damned, and the Flying Aces. The SCRG derby season runs from fall through the spring.

Teams
The Sin City Rollergirls league is composed of one travel team and four home teams. The All-Stars travel team is supported by four home teams, the Notorious VIP, the Tommy Gun Terrors, the Hoover Damned, and The Flying Aces.

WFTDA competition
Sin City competed at the first WFTDA Championships, the "Dust Devil" tournament, in 2006, where they finished in 12th place. In 2007, the WFTDA began hosting Regional playoffs to qualify for Championships, and at the first WFTDA Western Regional Tournament, Sin City won their opening round bout against Rose City Rollers or Portland, 95-92, but lost their second round bout to the Texas Rollergirls of Austin, Texas, 121-49.

In 2013, Sin City returned to WFTDA Playoff competition, at the newly-created Division 2 level, entering the tournament in Des Moines as the top seed. After opening their weekend with a 299-95 victory over Dallas Derby Devils, Sin City lost their semifinal to Jet City Rollergirls of Everett, Washington, 218-131, and then dropped the third-place game to Treasure Valley Rollergirls of Boise, 184-142 to finish in fourth place. In 2014, Sin City returned to Division 2 Playoffs as the fifth seed in Duluth, Minnesota, winning their opening game against Brewcity Bruisers of Milwaukee, 194-141. Sin City followed this win by taking their semifinal against St. Chux Derby Chix 174-141 to secure a spot in the tournament final. Sin City lost the final to Detroit Derby Girls 318-106 to finish second. The second-place finish at Duluth qualified Sin City for the Division 2 third-place game at WFTDA Championships in Nashville that year, which they lost in a close 164-163 result to Bear City of Berlin.

WFTDA rankings

References

External links
Official Website

Women's sports in the United States
Sports teams in Las Vegas
Roller derby leagues in Nevada
Roller derby leagues established in 2005
2005 establishments in Nevada